Spišská Stará Ves (or ; ; ; Goral: Golembarg) is a small town and urban municipality in Kežmarok District in the Prešov Region of north Slovakia.

Prior to World War I, the town was part of Szepes county in the Kingdom of Hungary.

History
In historical records the town was first mentioned in 1272.

Geography
It has a population of about 2,200 people. Spišská Stará Ves is the centre of Zamagurie region and is close to the Dunajec River.

Demographics
According to the 2001 census, the town had 2,355 inhabitants. 93.76% of inhabitants were Slovaks, 4.50% Roma, 0.53% Polish, 0.30% Czechs and 0.25% Ukrainians. The religious makeup was 93.25% Roman Catholics, 2.93% Greek Catholics, 1.66% people with no religious affiliation and 0.85% Lutherans.

References

External links 

 Town website

Cities and towns in Slovakia
Villages and municipalities in Kežmarok District
Spiš